Watermouth Castle is a building in Watermouth, near Ilfracombe, North Devon, England, designed by George Wightwick as a residence for the Bassett family in the mid-19th century and is not a true castle but a country house built to resemble one. It has been designated as a Grade II* listed building.

Located near the shore of the inlet of Watermouth, near Ilfracombe, Devon, the castle houses a collection of Victorian antiques centred on domestic tools and amusement machines, a family theme park and holiday apartments. The Bassetts left the castle in 1945.

Descent of ownership

Bassett

The castle was built by Joseph Davie Bassett (1764–1846), son of John Davie (died 1793) of Orleigh Court, Buckland Brewer and his wife Eleanora Basset of Heanton Court, Heanton Punchardon. His brother was Rev. Charles Davie (1760–1836), rector of Heanton Punchardon, which advowson was possessed by the Bassett family. After his mother became the sole heiress of her childless brother Francis Basset (died 1802), Joseph Davie adopted the name Bassett in lieu of his patronymic and adopted the Bassett armorials. He sold Orleigh in 1807 and built Watermouth Castle as his principal residence. He married Mary Irwin (1777–1862) of Barnstaple.

The Devon topographer Rev. John Swete visited Watermouth, before the construction of the Georgian castle, as part of his travels in 1796, and was entertained by Mr Davie. He painted the Palladian house then standing on the site and recorded the visit in his journal.

Joseph Bassett's eldest son and heir was Arthur Davie Bassett (1801–1870), who died in a horse-riding accident. He married Harriet Sarah Crawfurth, daughter of Thomas Smith Crawfurth of Dulverton, by whom he had his eldest surviving son Reverend Arthur Crawfurth Davie Bassett (1830–1880), who was unmarried and died at Watermouth Castle. His heir was his sister Harriet Mary Bassett, the wife of Charles Henry Williams (1834–1908), MP, of Pilton House, Pilton, near Barnstaple.

In 1908, the castle was inherited by their daughter Edith Bassett Bassett (1862–1943) (born Edith Basset Williams), married to Captain Ernest Charles Penn Curzon (1856–1938). During World War I she started to sell off the ancient Basset lands. Watermouth Castle had been used as a military hospital during World War I, and in the 1920s she started to sell the Berrynarbor farms and cottages. In 1942 she sold most of the contents of Watermouth Castle.

Wickenden
The castle passed through the hands of many short-term owners and property speculators but was at last purchased by Keith Wickenden (1932–1983), a Conservative MP for Dorking South and businessman. He was killed in a light aircraft crash near Shoreham Airport in 1983.

Haines
Watermouth Castle was purchased from Wickenden in 1977 by Richard L. Haines of Market Deeping, Cambridgeshire and his wife. The castle was turned into an amusement centre, which as of 2012 was run by their two sons Jonathan and Antonie Haines.

Current use 
The castle is a tourist attraction open to the public by admission charge. Within the Castle, areas include Castle Treasure, Dungeon Labyrinths and The Watershow Extravaganza. Its grounds feature nine rides spread across themed areas known as Adventure Land, Merry go Land and Gnome Land.

References

External links

   Watermouth Castle official website

Houses completed in 1825
Castles in Devon
Grade II* listed buildings in Devon
Museums in Devon
Amusement museums in the United Kingdom
Amusement parks in England
Mock castles in England